The Younger Dryas, which occurred circa 12,900 to 11,700 years BP, was a return to glacial conditions which temporarily reversed the gradual climatic warming after the Last Glacial Maximum (LGM), which lasted from circa 27,000 to 20,000 years BP. The Younger Dryas was the last stage of the Pleistocene epoch that spanned from 2,580,000 to 11,700 years BP and it preceded the current, warmer Holocene epoch. The Younger Dryas was the most severe and longest lasting of several interruptions to the warming of the Earth's climate, and it was preceded by the Late Glacial Interstadial, an interval of relative warmth that lasted from 14,670 to 12,900 BP.

The change was relatively sudden, taking place in decades, and it resulted in a decline of temperatures in Greenland by 4~10 °C (7.2~18 °F), and advances of glaciers and drier conditions over much of the temperate Northern Hemisphere. A number of theories have been put forward about the cause, and the most widely supported by scientists is that the Atlantic meridional overturning circulation, which transports warm water from the Equator towards the North Pole, was interrupted by an influx of fresh, cold water from North America into the Atlantic.

The Younger Dryas did not affect the climate equally worldwide, although the average worldwide temperature changed drastically. For example, in the Southern Hemisphere and some areas of the Northern Hemisphere, such as southeastern North America, a slight warming occurred.

The Younger Dryas is named after an indicator genus, the alpine-tundra wildflower Dryas octopetala, as its leaves are occasionally abundant in late glacial, often minerogenic-rich sediments, such as the lake sediments of Scandinavia.

General description and context 

The presence of a distinct cold period at the end of the LGM interval has been known for a long time. Paleobotanical and lithostratigraphic studies of Swedish and Danish bog and lake sites, as in the Allerød clay pit in Denmark, first recognized and described the Younger Dryas.

The Younger Dryas is the youngest and longest of three stadials, which resulted from typically abrupt climatic changes that took place over the last 16,000 years. Within the Blytt–Sernander classification of north European climatic phases, the prefix "Younger" refers to the recognition that this original "Dryas" period was preceded by a warmer stage, the Allerød oscillation, which, in turn, was preceded by the Older Dryas, around 14,000 calibrated years BP. That is not securely dated, and estimates vary by 400 years, but it is generally accepted to have lasted around 200 years. In northern Scotland, the glaciers were thicker and more extensive than during the Younger Dryas. The Older Dryas, in turn, was preceded by another warmer stage, the Bølling oscillation, that separated it from a third and even older stadial, often known as the Oldest Dryas. The Oldest Dryas occurred about 1,770 calibrated years before the Younger Dryas and lasted about 400 calibrated years. According to the GISP2 ice core from Greenland, the Oldest Dryas occurred between about 15,070 and 14,670 calibrated years BP.

In Ireland, the Younger Dryas has also been known as the Nahanagan Stadial, and in Great Britain it has been called the Loch Lomond Stadial. In the Greenland Summit ice core chronology, the Younger Dryas corresponds to Greenland Stadial 1 (GS-1). The preceding Allerød warm period (interstadial) is subdivided into three events: Greenland Interstadial-1c to 1a (GI-1c to GI-1a).

Abrupt climate change 

Since 1916 and the onset and the subsequent refinement of pollen analytical techniques and a steadily-growing number of pollen diagrams, palynologists have concluded that the Younger Dryas was a distinct period of vegetational change in large parts of Europe during which vegetation of a warmer climate was replaced by that of a generally cold climate, a glacial plant succession that often contained Dryas octopetala. The drastic change in vegetation is typically interpreted to be an effect of a sudden decrease in (annual) temperature, unfavorable for the forest vegetation that had been spreading northward rapidly. The cooling not only favored the expansion of cold-tolerant, light-demanding plants and associated steppe fauna, but also led to regional glacial advances in Scandinavia and a lowering of the regional snow line.

The change to glacial conditions at the onset of the Younger Dryas in the higher latitudes of the Northern Hemisphere, between 12,900 and 11,500 calibrated years BP, has been argued to have been quite abrupt. It is in sharp contrast to the warming of the preceding Older Dryas interstadial. Its end has been inferred to have occurred over a period of a decade or so, but the onset may have even been faster. Thermally fractionated nitrogen and argon isotope data from Greenland ice core GISP2 indicate that its summit was around  colder during the Younger Dryas than today.

Nothing of the period's size, extent, or rapidity of abrupt climate change has been experienced since its end.

In addition to the Younger, Older, and Oldest Dryases, a century-long period of colder climate, similar to the Younger Dryas in abruptness, has occurred within both the Bølling oscillation and the Allerød oscillation interstadials. The cold period that occurred within the Bølling oscillation is known as the intra-Bølling cold period, and the cold period that occurred within the Allerød oscillation is known as the intra-Allerød cold period. Both cold periods are comparable in duration and intensity with the Older Dryas and began and ended quite abruptly. The cold periods have been recognized in sequence and relative magnitude in paleoclimatic records from Greenland ice cores, European lacustrine sediments, Atlantic Ocean sediments, and the Cariaco Basin, Venezuela.

Examples of older Younger Dryas-like events have been reported from the ends (called terminations)
of older glacial periods. Temperature-sensitive lipids, long chain alkenones, found in lake and marine sediments, are well-regarded as a powerful paleothermometer for the quantitative reconstruction of past continental climates. The application of alkenone paleothermometers to high-resolution paleotemperature reconstructions of older glacial terminations have found that very similar, Younger Dryas-like paleoclimatic oscillations occurred during Terminations II and IV. If so, the Younger Dryas is not the unique paleoclimatic event, in terms of size, extent, and rapidity, as it is often regarded to be. Furthermore, paleoclimatologists and Quaternary geologists reported finding what they characterized as well-expressed Younger Dryas events in the Chinese δ records of Termination III in stalagmites from high-altitude caves in Shennongjia area, Hubei Province, China. Various paleoclimatic records from ice cores, deep-sea sediments, speleothems, continental paleobotanical data, and loesses show similar abrupt climate events, which are consistent with Younger Dryas events, during the terminations of the last four glacial periods (see Dansgaard–Oeschger event). They argue that Younger Dryas events might be an intrinsic feature of deglaciations that occur at the end of glacial periods.

Timing 
Analyses of stable isotopes from Greenland ice cores provide estimates for the start and end of the Younger Dryas. The analysis of Greenland Summit ice cores, as part of the Greenland Ice Sheet Project 2 and Greenland Icecore Project, estimated that the Younger Dryas started about 12,800 ice (calibrated) years BP. Depending on the specific ice core analysis consulted, the Younger Dryas is estimated to have lasted 1,150~1,300 years. Measurements of oxygen isotopes from the GISP2 ice core suggest the ending of the Younger Dryas took place over just 40~50 years in three discrete steps, each lasting five years.

The end of the Younger Dryas has been dated to around 11,550 years ago, occurring at 10,000 BP (uncalibrated radiocarbon year), a "radiocarbon plateau" by a variety of methods, mostly with consistent results:

{| class="wikitable"
|-
!Years ago !! Place
|-
|height=25| 11500 ± 50  || GRIP ice core, Greenland
|-
|height=25| 11530  || Krakenes Lake, western Norway
|-
|height=25| 11570 || Cariaco Basin core, Venezuela
|-
|height=25| 11570 || German oak and pine dendrochronology
|-
|height=25| 11640 ± 280 || GISP2 ice core, Greenland
|}

The International Commission on Stratigraphy put the start of the Greenlandian stage, and implicitly the end of the Younger Dryas, at 11,700 years before 2000.

Although the start of the Younger Dryas is regarded to be synchronous across the North Atlantic region, recent research concluded that the start of the Younger Dryas might be time-transgressive even within there. After an examination of laminated varve sequences, Muschitiello and Wohlfarth found that the environmental changes that define the beginning of the Younger Dryas are diachronous in their time of occurrence according to latitude. According to the changes, the Younger Dryas occurred as early as around 12,900~13,100 calibrated years ago along latitude 56–54°N. Further north, they found that the changes occurred at roughly 12,600–12,750 calibrated years ago.

According to the analyses of varved sediments from Lake Suigetsu, Japan, and other paleoenvironmental records from Asia, a substantial delay occurred in the onset and the end of the Younger Dryas between Asia and the North Atlantic. For example, paleoenvironmental analysis of sediment cores from Lake Suigetsu in Japan found the Younger Dryas temperature decline of 2–4 °C between 12,300 and 11,250 varve (calibrated) years BP, instead of about 12,900 calibrated years BP in the North Atlantic region.

In contrast, the abrupt shift in the radiocarbon signal from apparent radiocarbon dates of 11,000 radiocarbon years to radiocarbon dates of 10,700–10,600 radiocarbon years BP in terrestrial macrofossils and tree rings in Europe over a 50-year period occurred at the same time in the varved sediments of Lake Suigetsu. However, this same shift in the radiocarbon signal antedates the start of Younger Dryas at Lake Suigetsu by a few hundred years. Interpretations of data from Chinese also confirm that the Younger Dryas East Asia lags the North Atlantic Younger Dryas cooling by at least 200~300 years. Although the interpretation of the data is more murky and ambiguous, the end of the Younger Dryas and the start of Holocene warming likely were similarly delayed in Japan and in other parts of East Asia.

Similarly, an analysis of a stalagmite growing from a cave in Puerto Princesa Subterranean River National Park, Palawan, the Philippines, found that the onset of the Younger Dryas was also delayed there. Proxy data recorded in the stalagmite indicate that more than 550 calibrated years were needed for Younger Dryas drought conditions to reach their full extent in the region and about 450 calibrated years to return to pre-Younger Dryas levels after it ended.

Global effects 
In Western Europe and Greenland, the Younger Dryas is a well-defined synchronous cool period. Cooling in the tropical North Atlantic may, however, have preceded it by a few hundred years; South America shows a less well-defined initiation but a sharp termination. The Antarctic Cold Reversal appears to have started a thousand years before the Younger Dryas and has no clearly defined start or end; Peter Huybers has argued that there is a fair confidence in the absence of the Younger Dryas in Antarctica, New Zealand and parts of Oceania. Timing of the tropical counterpart to the Younger Dryas, the Deglaciation Climate Reversal (DCR), is difficult to establish as low latitude ice core records generally lack independent dating over the interval. An example of this is the Sajama ice core (Bolivia), for which the timing of the DCR has been pinned to that of the GISP2 ice core record (central Greenland). Climatic change in the central Andes during the DCR, however, was significant and was characterized by a shift to much wetter and likely colder conditions. The magnitude and abruptness of the changes would suggest that low latitude climate did not respond passively during the YD/DCR.

Effects of the Younger Dryas were of varying intensity throughout North America. In western North America, its effects were less intense than in Europe or northeast North America; however, evidence of a glacial re-advance indicates that Younger Dryas cooling occurred in the Pacific Northwest. Speleothems from the Oregon Caves National Monument and Preserve in southern Oregon's Klamath Mountains yield evidence of climatic cooling contemporaneous to the Younger Dryas.

Other features include the following:

 Replacement of forest in Scandinavia with glacial tundra (which is the habitat of the plant Dryas octopetala)
 Glaciation or increased snow in mountain ranges around the world
 Formation of solifluction layers and loess deposits in Northern Europe
 More dust in the atmosphere, originating from deserts in Asia
 A decline in evidence for Natufian hunter gatherer permanent settlements in the Levant, suggesting a reversion to a more mobile way of life
 The Huelmo–Mascardi Cold Reversal in the Southern Hemisphere ended at the same time
 Decline of the Clovis culture; while no definitive cause for the extinction of many species in North America such as the Columbian mammoth, as well as the Dire wolf, Camelops, and other Rancholabrean megafauna during the Younger Dryas has been determined, climate change and human hunting activities have been suggested as contributing factors. Recently, it has been found that these megafauna populations collapsed 1000 years earlier.

North America

East 
The Younger Dryas is a period significant to the study of the response of biota to abrupt climate change and to the study of how humans coped with such rapid changes. The effects of sudden cooling in the North Atlantic had strong regional effects in North America, with some areas experiencing more abrupt changes than others. A cooling and ice advance accompanying the transition into the Younger Dryas between 13,300 and 13,000 cal years BP has been confirmed with many radiocarbon dates from four sites in western New York State. The advance is similar in age to the Two Creeks forest bed in Wisconsin.

The effects of the Younger Dryas cooling affected the area that is now New England and parts of maritime Canada more rapidly than the rest of the present day United States at the beginning and the end of the Younger Dryas chronozone. Proxy indicators show that summer temperature conditions in Maine decreased by up to 7.5 °C. Cool summers, combined with cold winters and low precipitation, resulted in a treeless tundra up to the onset of the Holocene, when the boreal forests shifted north.

Vegetation in the central Appalachian Mountains east towards the Atlantic Ocean was dominated by spruce (Picea spp.) and tamarack (Larix laricina) boreal forests that later changed rapidly to temperate, more broad-leaf tree forest conditions at the end of the Younger Dryas period. Conversely, pollen and macrofossil evidence from near Lake Ontario indicates that cool, boreal forests persisted into the early Holocene. West of the Appalachians, in the Ohio River Valley and south to Florida rapid, no-analog vegetation responses seem to have been the result of rapid climate changes, but the area remained generally cool, with hardwood forest dominating. During the Younger Dryas, the Southeastern United States was warmer and wetter than the region had been during the Pleistocene because of trapped heat from the Caribbean within the North Atlantic Gyre caused by a weakened Atlantic meridional overturning circulation (AMOC).

Central 
Also, a gradient of changing effects occurred from the Great Lakes region south to Texas and Louisiana. Climatic forcing moved cold air into the northern portion of the American interior, much as it did the Northeast. Although there was not as abrupt a delineation as seen on the Eastern Seaboard, the Midwest was significantly colder in the northern interior than it was south, towards the warmer climatic influence of the Gulf of Mexico. In the north, the Laurentide Ice Sheet re-advanced during the Younger Dryas, depositing a moraine from west Lake Superior to southeast Quebec. Along the southern margins of the Great Lakes, spruce dropped rapidly, while pine increased, and herbaceous prairie vegetation decreased in abundance, but increased west of the region.

Rocky Mountains 
Effects in the Rocky Mountain region were varied. In the northern Rockies, a significant increase in pines and firs suggests warmer conditions than before and a shift to subalpine parkland in places. That is hypothesized to be the result of a northward shift in the jet stream, combined with an increase in summer insolation as well as a winter snow pack that was higher than today, with prolonged and wetter spring seasons. There were minor re-advancements of glaciers in place, particularly in the northern ranges, but several sites in the Rocky Mountain ranges show little to no changes in vegetation during the Younger Dryas. Evidence also indicates an increase in precipitation in New Mexico because of the same Gulf conditions that were influencing Texas.

West 
The Pacific Northwest region experienced 2 to 3 °C of cooling and an increase in precipitation. Glacial re-advancement has been recorded in British Columbia as well as in the Cascade Range. An increase of pine pollen indicates cooler winters within the central Cascades. On the Olympic Peninsula, a mid-elevation site recorded a decrease in fire, though forest persisted and erosion increased during the Younger Dryas, suggesting cool and wet conditions. Speleothem records indicate an increase in precipitation in southern Oregon, the timing of which coincides with increased sizes of pluvial lakes in the northern Great Basin. Pollen record from the Siskiyou Mountains suggests a lag in timing of the Younger Dryas, indicating a greater influence of warmer Pacific conditions on that range, but the pollen record is less chronologically constrained than the aforementioned speleothem record. The Southwest appears to have seen an increase in precipitation, as well, also with an average 2 °C of cooling.

Effects on agriculture 
The Younger Dryas is often linked to the Neolithic Revolution, with the adoption of agriculture in the Levant. The cold and dry Younger Dryas arguably lowered the carrying capacity of the area and forced the sedentary early Natufian population into a more mobile subsistence pattern. Further climatic deterioration is thought to have brought about cereal cultivation. While relative consensus exists regarding the role of the Younger Dryas in the changing subsistence patterns during the Natufian, its connection to the beginning of agriculture at the end of the period is still being debated.

Sea level 
Based upon solid geological evidence, consisting largely of the analysis of numerous deep cores from coral reefs, variations in the rates of sea level rise have been reconstructed for the postglacial period. For the early part of the sea level rise that is associated with deglaciation, three major periods of accelerated sea level rise, called meltwater pulses, occurred. They are commonly called
 meltwater pulse 1A0 for the pulse between 19,000~19,500 calibrated years ago;
 meltwater pulse 1A for the pulse between 14,600~14,300 calibrated years ago;
 meltwater pulse 1B for the pulse between 11,400~11,100 calibrated years ago.
The Younger Dryas occurred after meltwater pulse 1A, a 13.5 m rise over about 290 years, centered at about 14,200 calibrated years ago, and before meltwater pulse 1B, a 7.5 m rise over about 160 years, centered at about 11,000 calibrated years ago. Finally, not only did the Younger Dryas postdate both all of meltwater pulse 1A and predate all of meltwater pulse 1B, it was a period of significantly-reduced rate of sea level rise relative to the periods of time immediately before and after it.

Possible evidence of short-term sea level changes has been reported for the beginning of the Younger Dryas. First, the plotting of data by Bard and others suggests a small drop, less than 6 m, in sea level near the onset of the Younger Dryas. There is a possible corresponding change in the rate of change of sea level rise seen in the data from both Barbados and Tahiti. Given that this change is "within the overall uncertainty of the approach," it was concluded that a relatively smooth sea-level rise, with no significant accelerations, occurred then. Finally, research by Lohe and others in western Norway has reported a sea-level low-stand at 13,640 calibrated years ago and a subsequent Younger Dryas transgression starting at 13,080 calibrated years ago. They concluded that the timing of the Allerød low-stand and the subsequent transgression were the result of increased regional loading of the crust, and geoid changes were caused by an expanding ice sheet, which started growing and advancing in the early Allerød about 13,600 calibrated years ago, well before the start of the Younger Dryas.

Cause 
The Younger Dryas is thought to have been caused primarily by significant reduction or shutdown of the North Atlantic "Conveyor" – which circulates warm tropical waters northward – as the consequence of deglaciation in North America and a sudden influx of fresh water from Lake Agassiz. The precise mechanism for the rapid melting is still the subject of active research. The lack of geological evidence for such an event, stimulated further exploration that has now identified a pathway along the Mackenzie River that would have spilled fresh water into the Arctic and thence into the Atlantic. The global climate would then have become locked into the new state until freezing removed the fresh water "lid" from the North Atlantic. However, simulations indicated that a one-time-flood could not likely cause the new state to be locked for 1,000 years. Once the flood ceased, the AMOC would recover and the Younger Dryas would stop in less than 100 years. Therefore, continuous freshwater input was necessary to maintain a weak AMOC for more than 1,000 years. Recent study proposed that the snowfall could be a source of continuous freshwater resulting in a prolonged weakened state of the AMOC.

There is now compelling evidence for repeated, but highly variable, discharges of meltwater with contemporaneous changes in Atlantic circulation during the last glacial cycle. The latest research, supported by general circulation model simulations, suggests that AMOC variations also depend on other factors and nonlinear forcings such as internal variability and changes in the carbon cycle, but that freshwater forcing is dominant. It is often noted that the Younger Dryas is merely the last of 25 or 26 such major episodes (Dansgaard-Oeschger (D-O) events) over the past 120 thousand years. These episodes are characterized by abrupt beginnings and endings (with changes taking place on timescales of decades or centuries).  The Younger Dryas is best known and best understood because it is the most recent. Because it is only one of many such events, mainstream scientists have not attempted to attribute it to a unique cause and the basic AMOC/abrupt climate-change (AMOC/ACC) hypothesis continues to be supported by current work on this subject.

There are several hypotheses for the cause of the increased flux of meltwater that led to the Younger Dryas onset. One suggestion is that the jet stream shifted northward in response to the changing topographic forcing of the melting North American ice sheet, which brought more rain to the North Atlantic, which freshened the ocean surface enough to slow the thermohaline circulation. Another idea is that a solar flare may have been responsible for the megafaunal extinction, but that cannot explain the apparent variability in the extinction across all continents. The Younger Dryas impact hypothesis attributes the cooling to the impact of a disintegrating comet or asteroid, but this idea is rejected by most experts.  The Laacher See volcanic eruption hypothesis has likewise been ruled out because precise dating demonstrates that it erupted more than 200 years before the Younger Dryas onset.

End of the Younger Dryas 
The end of the Younger Dryas was caused by an increase in carbon dioxide levels and a shift in Atlantic Meridional Overturning Circulation. Evidence suggests that most of the increase in temperature between the Last Glacial Maximum and the Holocene took place in the immediate aftermath of the Oldest Dryas and Younger Dryas, with there being comparatively little variations in global temperature within the Oldest and Younger Dryas periods and within the Bølling–Allerød warming.

See also 
 
 Preboreal oscillation - Cooling episode within the preboreal 
 
 Huelmo–Mascardi Cold Reversal
 
 
 Meltwater pulse 1B
 
 
 
 
 
 
 Beaufort Gyre reversal

Footnotes

References

External links 
 
 
 
 
 
 
 

Blytt–Sernander system
Nordic Stone Age
Palynology
Last Glacial Maximum
Stone Age Europe
10th millennium BC
Historical eras
11th millennium BC